The HBV RNA encapsidation signal epsilon (HBV_epsilon) is an element essential for HBV virus replication.

It is an RNA structure situated near the 5' end of the HBV pregenomic RNA. 
The structure consists of a lower stem, a bulge region, an upper stem and a tri-loop.
The structure was determined and refined through enzymatic probing and NMR spectroscopy. 
The closure of the tri-loop was not predicted by RNA structure prediction programs but observed in the NMR structure. 
The regions shown to be critical for encapsidation of the RNA in the viral lifecycle are the bulge, upper stem and tri-loop which interact with the terminal protein domain of the HBV viral polymerase.

See also
Heron HBV RNA encapsidation signal epsilon
Duck HBV RNA encapsidation signal epsilon
Hepatitis B virus PRE alpha
Hepatitis B virus PRE beta
Hepatitis B virus PRE 1151–1410

References

External links
 
 HBVRegDB Hepatitis B Virus HBV Regulatory Sequence Database (HBVRegDB)

Cis-regulatory RNA elements
Hepatitis B virus